The Fighting Parson is a 1933 American Western film directed by Harry L. Fraser and starring Hoot Gibson, Marceline Day and Ethel Wales.

Cast
 Hoot Gibson as Steve Hartley
 Marceline Day as Suzan Larkin
 Skeeter Bill Robbins as Arizona Joe
 Ethel Wales as Mrs. Betsy Larkin – Suzan's aunt
 Stanley Blystone as Bart McCade
 Robert Frazer as Rev. Joseph Doolittle 
 Charles King as Mike – henchman
 Phil Dunham as George Larkin
 Jules Cowles as Marshal J. A. Darby
 Fred Gilman as Express Agent

References

Bibliography
 Pitts, Michael R. Western Movies: A Guide to 5,105 Feature Films. McFarland, 2012.

External links
 

1933 films
1933 Western (genre) films
1930s English-language films
American Western (genre) films
American black-and-white films
Films directed by Harry L. Fraser
1930s American films